Jamie Freeman (27 May 1965 – 3 December 2022) was a British singer, songwriter, musician, and record producer, who previously fronted The Jamie Freeman Agreement. He was the brother of actor Martin Freeman and musician Tim Freeman (Frazier Chorus). He co-founded Union Music Store  in Lewes, East Sussex with his ex-wife, Stevie Smith. He was a member of the Americana Music Association (Nashville) and Americana Music Association UK. His song, "The Fire",  co-written with Ben Glover, was nominated for UK Song Of The Year at the UK Americana Awards. 

Freeman's primary instrument was guitar but he was also a drummer. He started drumming at the age of 13 and played with Brighton alt.country rockers Salter Cane for eight years. He played electric and acoustic guitar, and a kick-drum when playing solo. In the studio he also played keyboards, bass, lap steel and percussion. He played with Frazier Chorus as a member of the touring band, and performed on their third album Wide Awake, released on the Pure label.

His 2019 album Dreams About Falling features co-writes with, among others, Angaleena Presley, Brandy Zdan, and Amy Speace. (Two songs on Freeman's second album were co-written with Amy Tudor, a poet from Kentucky.) The album also features duets with 
Brandy Zdan, Amy Speace, and Angaleena Presley. The album release was supported by over thirty live shows. 

In 2019, Freeman attended the House of Songs Songwriter Summit in Bentonville, Arkansas, writing with Elles Bailey, Dylan Earle, Graham Weber, and Jonathan Terrell.

Death
Freeman died from brain cancer on 3 December 2022. He was 57 years old.

Albums 
Freeman's first album Just You, released under his own name, was described as "a perfect blend of UK folk/American roots" by Gilded Palace. The follow up 100 Miles From Town was released under the band's name The Jamie Freeman Agreement and features guest appearances by several respected artists including Larkin Poe, Brandy Zdan, Richard Smith, and The Good Lovelies. Mark Chadwick (The Levellers) was consultant producer on the album. His third album Dreams About Falling  was produced by Grammy-nominated producer Neilson Hubbard and received 4-star reviews in Maverick Music Magazine and R'N'R magazine.

Critical acclaim 
 "Jamie is patently in the vanguard of the current crop of British songwriters, regardless of genre-type. Dreams About Falling is a musical tour de force" – FolkRadio.co.uk

"This is a great CD that should be nominated for Best Album at the Folk Awards" 4.5 Stars – Maverick Magazine 

"100 Miles From Town – the Jamie Freeman Agreement set about defining English Americana" – FATEA

Discography

Production credits

Production reviews

The Self Help Group (Not Waving But Drowning, Dead Stars) 
"The actual sound is a huge tribute to producer Jamie Freeman, giving great depth and openness to the recording but never overdoing the instrumentation, imbuing the whole disc with a power and drive that really shouldn't be possible when taking into account the mellowness of the music. –  American Roots UK

"Dead Stars is the bands second studio outing, impeccably produced by Jamie Freeman" – Brighton's Finest

"Working with the same producer as the on the first album, the album is again a small masterpiece" FATEA

The Jamie Freeman Agreement (100 Miles From Town) 
"It is high quality, beautifully written, arranged, sung, played and produced music that keeps the listener in thrall... and when it comes to the production there is a lovely clear open spacey feel even on songs with a fuller instrumentation. He seems to have an instinctive 'knack' for getting everything perfectly in balance and co-ordinated, and yet there is always a strong dramatic edginess to the performances and sound." American Roots UK

References

External links 
Official website
 

1965 births
2022 deaths
English folk musicians
English songwriters
English record producers
English multi-instrumentalists
Americana musicians
Deaths from brain cancer in England